The Bolton Cricket League is a cricket league comprising fifteen teams in and around Bolton, Greater Manchester in North West England. The league runs competitions at First Team, Second Team, Under 18, Under 15, Under 13 and Under 11 levels. It expanded after the 2015 season, with nine clubs joining from in and around the area. However, the league lost two established clubs in the process, due to the formation of the Greater Manchester Cricket League in 2016.

History
The league was established in 1930 after breaking away from the Bolton Cricket Association. The League Heahquarters is based at Barley Brook Meadow, Bolton, Lancashire. The League also hold the Hamer Cup competition; a knockout cup competition for first teams in the Bolton Cricket League. The most successful team(s) to date is both Walkden and Farnworth who became league champions for the fourteenth time in 2019 and 2017 respectively.

Champions

League performance by season from 2011

Notable players
A number of quality cricketers have played in the Bolton Cricket League including:
Michael Atherton
Ian Cowap
John Crawley
Kapil Dev
Charlie Griffith
Matthew Hayden
Ronnie Irani
Dheeraj Jadhav
Collis King
Javed Miandad
Sir Garfield Sobers
Mark Taylor
Mark Waugh
Farokh Engineer
Aiden Markram
Footballing brothers Gary Neville and Phil Neville also played in the Bolton Cricket League.

See also
Club cricket
List of English cricket clubs

References

External links
 Official website

English domestic cricket competitions
Sport in the Metropolitan Borough of Bolton
Cricket in Greater Manchester
Organisations based in the Metropolitan Borough of Bolton